Cadell ap Brochfael (died c. 808), also known as Cadell Powys, was an 8th- and 9th-century king of Powys.

He was the son of Brochfael ap Elisedd, whom he succeeded to the throne c. 773.

The Annals of Wales mention his death, and Phillimore's reconstruction dates the entry to AD 808.  His name also was inscribed (as "Cattell") in the Pillar of Eliseg.

References 

Monarchs of Powys
House of Gwertherion
8th-century Welsh monarchs
9th-century Welsh monarchs
800s deaths
Year of death uncertain
Year of birth unknown